Chakali may refer to:

 Chakali (caste), a local name of the Rajaka caste of South India
 Chakli, a savoury snack from India
 Chakali language, a Gur language of Ghana
 Chakali Ailamma (1919–1985), Indian revolutionary